William Francis Smith (born April 7, 1888) was an American college football player and coach. He served as the head coach at Indiana University of Pennsylvania from 1914 to 1918.

References

1888 births
Year of death missing
IUP Crimson Hawks football coaches
IUP Crimson Hawks football players
Mansfield Mounties football players
High school football coaches in Pennsylvania
People from Tioga County, Pennsylvania